Paul Crossley may refer to:

 Paul Crossley (pianist) (born 1944), British pianist
 Paul Crossley (footballer) (1948–1996), English footballer
 Paul Crossley (art historian) (1945–2019), professor of the history of art